The Girl on the Road is a 1925 German silent comedy film directed by Richard Eichberg and starring Lilian Harvey and Hans Brausewetter. It was shot at the Johannisthal Studios in Berlin with location shooting in cities across Germany. The film's sets were designed by the art director Kurt Richter.

Cast
In alphabetical order
 Geo Bergal as Jüngling
 Hans Brausewetter as Kavalier ohne Bedenken
 Dina Gralla as Die 'Erfahrene'
 Lilian Harvey as Die 'Kleine'
 Ellen Heel as Dame von Welt
 Hans Junkermann as Präsident des Rennklubs
 Hans Stürm as Gerichtsvollzieher
 Ernst Winar as Herrenreiter

References

Bibliography
 Grange, William. Cultural Chronicle of the Weimar Republic. Scarecrow Press, 2008.

External links

1925 films
Films of the Weimar Republic
Films directed by Richard Eichberg
German silent feature films
1926 comedy films
1926 films
German comedy films
German black-and-white films
1925 comedy films
Silent comedy films
1920s German films
Films shot at Johannisthal Studios